5022 may refer to:
The year in the 6th millennium

postal codes
5022 Henley Beach
5022 Henley Beach South
5022 Tennyson

air flights
Spanair Flight 5022